Kim Jae-cheon (born 19 June 1968) is a South Korean field hockey player. He competed in the men's tournament at the 1988 Summer Olympics.

References

External links
 

1968 births
Living people
South Korean male field hockey players
Olympic field hockey players of South Korea
Field hockey players at the 1988 Summer Olympics
Place of birth missing (living people)